The genital ridge (or gonadal ridge) is the precursor to the gonads. The genital ridge initially consists mainly of mesenchyme and cells of underlying mesonephric origin. Once oogonia  enter this area they attempt to associate with these somatic cells. Development proceeds and the oogonia become fully surrounded by a layer of cells (pre-granulosa cells).

The genital ridge appears at approximately five weeks, and gives rise to the sex cords.

Associated genes
Genes associated with the developing gonad can be categorized into those that form the sexually indifferent gonad, those that determine whether the indifferent gonad will differentiate as male or female, and those that promote differentiation into male or female parts.  Genes that form the sexually indifferent gonad are SF1 and WT1. Genes that determine sex are SRY, SOX9, and DAX1.  Genes driving the differentiation into male or female structures are SF1, WT1, and WNT4. The other genes have roles in development that are not exclusively sex-related.

DMRT1 
Evidence suggests that a DM domain gene, DMRT1, is involved in sexual development. This gene is located on chromosome 9.  Its location suggests that it is required for the development of testis. XY humans hemizygous for the chromosome 9p, where DMRT1 is located, are often feminized. This feminization can range from ambiguous genitalia to XY sex reversal.
The DMRT1 homolog from chicken has been localized on the Z chromosome. Birds have heterogametic females (ZW) and homogametic males (ZZ). The avian Z chromosome is conserved synteny with chromosome 9 of humans. ZZ embryos have a higher dose of DMRT1 and therefore have the potential to have a higher expression. It has been suggested that embryos with a higher expression of Dmrt1 expression develop into males while embryos with a lower expression are led to female development.

In the mouse gonadal primordium, the genital ridge, which forms from intermediate mesoderm, becomes morphologically distinct at E10.5. By E12, sexual differentiation of the gonad is apparent, indicating that genes involved in the formation of the bipotential gonad is expressed before E10.5 and E12. Before E10.5, Dmrt1 is expressed at similar levels in the genital ridges of XX as well as XY embryos. By E12.5 and E13.5, DMRT1 is expressed deferentially as sex specific structures start to form.  By E14.5 and E15.5, DMRT1 expression is maintained in the testis while it has begun to decrease in the ovary.

SRY 
In mice, the genital ridge houses the transcript for SRY, the Y-chromosomal gene responsible for sex determination in mammals. The urogenital ridge is made up of the gonadal anlage and the mesonephros.  The mesonephros is involved in the development of the testis, but its role is in differentiation, and not determination. This is indicated by the absence of SRY expression in the mesonephros. SRY expression is expressed exclusively in the developing gonad, lacking a presence in any other tissue in embryos or adults.

See also 
 Development of the gonads

References

External links
 

Embryology of urogenital system